Richard Lert (19 September 1885 – 25 April 1980) was an American conductor of Austrian birth. Born in Vienna, he was the younger brother of stage director Ernst Lert. After graduating with a music degree from the University of Vienna, he took a conducting post at the Opernhaus Düsseldorf in 1910. He left there in 1912 to take a similar position at the Opera in Darmstadt where he remained for four years. In 1916 he married novelist Vicki Baum and that same year joined the conducting staff of the Opern- und Schauspielhaus Frankfurt.

From 1919-1923 Lert served as the music director of the Staatsoper Hannover and from 1923-1928 he was music director of the National Theatre Mannheim. He was thereafter active as a guest conductor with several opera companies and orchestras during the late 1920s and early 1930s. His base of operations during that period was Berlin and he appeared as a guest conductor frequently with the Berlin Philharmonic and the Staatsoper Unter den Linden.

From 1936-1972 Lert served as the music director and conductor of the Pasadena Symphony. In 1947 he co-founded the Music Academy of the West in Santa Barbara, California, serving on the faculty there for many years. In 1964 he was awarded the Golden Baton Award from the American Symphony Orchestra League. He died at the age of 94 in Mountain View, California. His papers are held in the collection at the library of the University of Southern California where he was also a faculty member.

References

Further reading
Biography of Richard Lert at www.munzinger.de

External links 
 

1885 births
1980 deaths
American male conductors (music)
Austrian Jews
American people of Austrian-Jewish descent
Levites
Musicians from Vienna
20th-century American conductors (music)
20th-century American male musicians
Austrian emigrants to the United States